Gosairhat is an upazila of Shariatpur District in the Division of Dhaka, in south central Bangladesh.

Geography
It is the southernmost upazila of Shariatpur District. Located on the western bank of the Meghna River, it borders Damudya and Bhedargan upazilas to the north, Haimchar Upazila of Chandpur District to the east, Muladi and Hizla upazilas of Barisal District to the south, and Kalkini Upazila of Madaripur District to the west.

The upazila headquarters is spread over the only two urban areas of the upazila, Dhipur and Daser Jangal mauzas.

Demographics

According to the 2011 Bangladesh census, Gosairhat Upazila had 33,169 households and a population of 157,665, 7.0% of whom lived in urban areas. 12.7% of the population was under the age of 5. The literacy rate (age 7 and over) was 42.1%, compared to the national average of 51.8%.

The boundaries of the upazila were expanded in 2006 by the addition of Kuchaipatti Union, transferred from adjacent Hizla Upazila of Barisal District. The transfer accounts for 21,313 of the growth in population from 2001. Without it the population increase from 2001 to 2011 would have been 10.5%.

Administration
Gosairhat Upazila is divided into eight union parishads: Alawalpur, Goshairhat, Idilpur, Kodalpur, Kuchaipatti, Nager Para, Nalmuri, and Samantasar. The union parishads are subdivided into 84 mauzas and 221 villages.

In the 2009 upazila elections, Fazlur Rahman was elected Upazila Chairman, while Chowdhury Ahsan Siddiqui and Ferdousi Begum were elected vice chairmen. The Upazila Nirbahi Officer (UNO), who administers the upazila for the central government, is MST Kamrunnahar.

Parliamentary constituency Shariatpur-3 covers Damudya and Gosairhat upazilas, and the Bhedarganj Thana portion of Bhedarganj Upazila. Nahim Razzak of the Bangladesh Awami League was elected Member of Parliament in a 2012 by-election in which he was unopposed.

Notable people
Golam Ali Chowdhury (1824–1888), landlord and philanthropist

See also

 Education in Bangladesh
 Districts of Bangladesh
 Divisions of Bangladesh
 Upazilas of Bangladesh

References

 
Upazilas of Shariatpur District